Chengjiao Subdistrict is a rural subdistrict in Ningxiang City, Hunan Province, China.

Administrative division
The subdistrict is divided into fourteen villages and one community: Wei Community, Jinxing Village, Maotian Village, Tangwan Village, He'an Village, Luohuan Village, Guanxin Village, Shiquan Village, Mujia Village, Xujialong Village, Yaoshi Village, Douzitan Village, Weifengba Village, Chatingsi Village and Shitoukeng Village.

Culture
Huaguxi is the most influential form of local theater.

Transportation
The National Highway 319 continues into Yiyang City, linking Chengjiao Subdistrict to Jinghuapu Township.

The Jinzhou Highway from Yutan Subdistrict, runs through Chengjiao Town, Shuangjiangkou Town and Jinzhou Town, to Yuelu District of Changsha City.

The G5513 Changsha-Zhangjiajie Expressway runs southeast through Jinzhou Town to Wangcheng District of Changsha, and the northwest to Heshan District of Yiyang.

References

External links

Subdistricts of Ningxiang